Lukáš Vraštil (born 10 March 1994) is a Czech professional footballer who plays for Sigma Olomouc in the Czech First League.

References

External links
 
 

1994 births
Living people
Czech footballers
Czech Republic youth international footballers
Czech Republic under-21 international footballers
Association football defenders
Czech First League players
Czech National Football League players
FK Mladá Boleslav players
FK Ústí nad Labem players
FC Zbrojovka Brno players
FC Fastav Zlín players
FC Baník Ostrava players
People from Jilemnice
Sportspeople from the Liberec Region
SK Sigma Olomouc players